Cecilia Vianini (born 19 November 1976 in Verona) is a former Italian freestyle swimmer. She achieved many European-level medals and was many times finalist in world level competitions, mainly in freestyle relays. She participated for Italy in the Summer Olympic of Atlanta 1996, Sydney 2000 and Athens 2004.

See also
 Swimming at the 2004 Summer Olympics – Women's 4 × 100 metre freestyle relay
 Swimming at the 2004 Summer Olympics – Women's 4 × 200 metre freestyle relay
 Italy at the 2000 Summer Olympics
 Italy at the 1996 Summer Olympics
 European LC Championships 2000
 Swimming at the 1996 Summer Olympics – Women's 4 × 100 metre medley relay

References
 Cecilia Vianini on agendadiana.com
 Cecilia Vianini on Italian Swimming Federation's website

External links
 
 

1976 births
Living people
Sportspeople from Verona
Italian female swimmers
Olympic swimmers of Italy
Swimmers at the 1996 Summer Olympics
Swimmers at the 2000 Summer Olympics
Swimmers at the 2004 Summer Olympics
European Aquatics Championships medalists in swimming
Mediterranean Games silver medalists for Italy
Mediterranean Games bronze medalists for Italy
Mediterranean Games medalists in swimming
Swimmers at the 2001 Mediterranean Games